Schistura harnaiensis is a species of ray-finned fish in the stone loach genus Schistura from Pakistan.

References 

H
Fish described in 1969
Taxa named by Teodor T. Nalbant